Standleyanthus is a genus of Central American plants in the tribe Eupatorieae within the family Asteraceae.

The genus is named after US botanist Paul Carpenter Standley (1884-1963). The Latin specific epithet of triptychus is a compound word with 'tri' meaning three and 'ptychus' meaning plate.

Species
The only known species is Standleyanthus triptychus, which is native to Costa Rica.

References

Monotypic Asteraceae genera
Flora of Costa Rica
Eupatorieae
Plants described in 1971